3 Generations may refer to:

 3 Generations (film), a 2015 American film
 3 Generations (nonprofit), a non-profit film production company